Aethes mymara, the dark-spotted aethes, is a species of moth of the family Tortricidae. It was named by Razowski in 1997. It is found in North America, where it has been recorded from south-eastern Canada and the north-eastern United States, including Connecticut, Indiana, Massachusetts, North Carolina, Ontario, Tennessee and Washington.

Adults have been recorded on wing between May and August.

References

mymara
Moths described in 1997
Moths of North America
Taxa named by Józef Razowski